Galathea squamifera, the black squat lobster, or Montagu's plated lobster, is a species of squat lobster that lives in the north-east Atlantic Ocean and Mediterranean Sea.

Description
The rostrum is triangular in shape with four spines on either side. The first pair of pereiopods are 1½ times as long as the body, and have well-developed claws.

Distribution and ecology
G. squamifera is found from Norway to the Azores and in the Mediterranean Sea, and is the most commonly found species of squat lobster on the shores of Northern Europe.

G. squamifera is chiefly nocturnal, and catches passing prey, such as small fish, with its claws. Species which feed on G. squamifera include the fishes Scorpaena porcus and Serranus atricauda.

References

Squat lobsters
Crustaceans of the Atlantic Ocean
Crustaceans described in 1814